The 1996 Rio de Janeiro motorcycle Grand Prix was the penultimate round of the 1996 Grand Prix motorcycle racing season. It took place on 6 October 1996 at the Autódromo Internacional Nelson Piquet.

500 cc classification

250 cc classification

125 cc classification

References

Rio de Janeiro motorcycle Grand Prix
Rio de Janeiro
Rio de Janeiro Grand Prix